Terakawa is a Japanese surname. Notable people with the surname include:

, Japanese swimmer
, Japanese footballer
, Japanese voice actor

See also
28004 Terakawa, a main-belt asteroid

Japanese-language surnames